Hustler's P.O.M.E. (Product of My Environment) is the third studio album by American hip hop recording artist Jim Jones. The album was released in the United States on November 7, 2006  under Diplomat Records and Koch Records. The album features guest appearances by Cam'ron, Juelz Santana, Hell Rell, Jha Jha, Lil Wayne, Stack Bundles, Max B and R&B singer Rell.

The album's first single, "We Fly High", was released October 21, 2006. The single reached number five on the Billboard Hot 100, making it Jones' highest charting single to date. Another single, "Emotionless", was released on March 21, 2007. Koch Records re-released an expanded edition of the album on August 28, 2007, featuring previously unreleased tracks such as "Lookin' at the Game", which features Stack Bundles.

Commercial performance
The album debuted at number 6 on the Billboard 200, with first week sales of 106,000 copies in the United States.

Track listing

Charts

Weekly charts

Year-end charts

References

Jim Jones (rapper) albums
2006 albums
Albums produced by Chink Santana
Albums produced by the Runners
E1 Music albums
Diplomat Records albums